Baudeh may refer to:
 Baudeh-ye Olya
 Baudeh-ye Sofla